Liu Yuxin (born April 20, 1997), known in English as Xin Liu, is a Chinese singer, dancer and producer born in Guizhou Province. She rose to fame as the top contestant of iQiyi's survival reality program Youth With You 2, finishing first and becoming the center of the girl group THE9.[1] Since late 2021, XIN began her solo career. Her album "Epsilon" and "Xanadu" tops Chinese billboards. XIN is also the very first female captain of Street Dance of China (season 5).

XIN first gained recognition as a contestant on Chinese television talent show Up Young! (向上吧！少年) in 2012. In 2016, she competed in the girl-group survival reality program Lady Bees (蜜蜂少女队), debuting as a member of the resulting girl-group, LadyBees. In 2020, XIN finished first on iQiyi survival reality program Youth With You 2, leading to her debut as a member and the centre of THE9.

As a dancer, XIN started learning street dance when she was ten years old and focused on popping dance techniques. She has performed a variety of dance styles ranging from street dance styles to modern dance styles, including popping, locking, krump, urban, hip-hop, jazz, house, waacking, contemporary, swag in different dance competitions and shows.

As a singer, she released her 3-track EP ‘Epsilon’ in 2021, which tops the best selling records in China and worldwide. Since Dec 2021, she started releasing her first full-length album ‘Xanadu’ that includes 10 songs with 10 MV of 10+ different dancing styles. Some of her representative works include “Baby I Know”, “Boom Tick Boom”, "Hurricane", “Look Into The Mirror”, “Like Love”,  and "Beatholic".

XIN's fandom name is "UM", which stands for umbrella; her fandom colour is "XIN blue".

Early life 
XIN (ethnicity: Manchu), was born on April 20, 1997, in Guizhou, China. XIN's mother was a national level-local opera actor specialized in Kunqu. Her father worked in the Chinese classical music industry. Her grandfather worked in a Peking Opera group prior to retirement. Since her childhood, Liu had been traveling with her mother to different performances. She had learned ballet dance for a short period and passed Grade 8 of the Piano Grade Examination in China.

XIN started learning street dance when she was 10 years old, and she went to Beijing by herself to further her training in street dance when she turned 12. She finished her secondary education at the Beijing Contemporary Music School, majoring in Contemporary Music and Contemporary Dance. In 2010, she became the only disciple of James Lin, a well-known street dancer in China.

In 2014, XIN was accepted to the Tianjin University of Sport, majoring in Music Recording in the College of Art & Culture. XIN graduated with her bachelor's degree in June 2018. At the college graduation ceremony, she was a student speaker for the graduating class. She received the "Gold Harvest Award for the Most Influential Graduate of Class of 2018" and presented "The Most Innovative President" award to the university president as a student representative.

Career

Early career 
In 2012, XIN participated in Hunan TV's youth empowerment variety show Up Young! (向上吧！少年), winning the title of "Most Positive Youth Award".

In 2013, XIN participated in Dragon TV (SDTV)'s dance competition variety show So You Think You Can Dance (舞林争霸) and won the pass tickets from all four mentors including Yang Liping, Jordan Chan, Jin Xing and Fang Jun. In the same year, she was the winner of Sexy Dancer Popping competition in Guiyang, Guizhou, the winner of Top Battle in Beijing Contemporary Music Academy competition, as well as the runner-up in China Popping Session.

In 2014, XIN won the runner-up in Dance in Qian City and released her very first original song "Never" (从不).

In 2015, XIN released another original piece "18" and won the first place in the contemporary dance division of the 5th Annual Panlong Cup dance competition in the College of Art & Culture of Tianjin University of Sport.

2016–2019: LadyBees 
In March 2016, XIN participated in Zhejiang TV's Chinese girl group survival reality program Lady Bees (蜜蜂少女队). Prior to recording, she was a trainee for a 3-month closed-door training hosted by Xunfeng Culture. During the competition, was mentored by Nicky Wu as a member of "Shining Dragon Ball" throughout the show. On May 28, 2016, She made her debut as the center of LadyBees.

On April 26, 2017, XIN released a single "Only Have Music Left" (穷得只剩音乐) with Evey Zhang and Teresa Tseng, a promotional song in movie Hot Rival (热血情敌). On June 24, she participated in iQiyi's rap competition The Rap of China Season 1 (中国有嘻哈第一季) and passed audience approved by mentor Kris Wu. However, due to conflict of schedule, she stepped down from the competition after advancement.

On February 25, 2018, the network movie Lady Bees starring Liu was released on iQiyi. On March 17, 2018, XIN participated in iQiyi's dance reality show Hot Blood Dance Crew (热血街舞团). On March 23, XIN released her first solo EDM song "Feel Good". On May 20, Liu released her first EP entitled XIN, including "Hot Party", "Feel Good", "It's You" (就是你), and "Don't Want to Miss You" (不要想念你). Liu also participated in the preparation and post-production process of this album. In August 2018, she made a guest appearance in the movie iPartment 5 (爱情公寓5). In November 2018, LadyBees released the single and mini-album entitled Queen Bee, in which XIN starred in minifilm "Girl Power Age".

On May 18, 2019, XIN participated in Youku's street dance competition Street Dance of China Season II (这！就是街舞第二季). She successfully advanced from Vanness Wu's audition with her popping performance but was eliminated at the seven to smoke battle in the fifth episode as the 49th place of the season. On August 3, she was a special guest in the VERVE Street Dance Show hosted by professional street dancer Viho Yang.

Due to different personal and professional plans, LadyBees was disbanded later in 2019.

2020–2021: Youth With You 2, THE9 
In 2020, XIN participated in iQiyi's reality survival show Youth with You Season 2. She performed her original song "My Opening Speech" (我的开场白) as a self-introduction on February 22, 2020.

On March 22, 2020, XIN performed "No Joke" (adapted from Show Lo's song) in her Preliminary Ranking stage, and was ranked as A-class. On March 26, 2020, XIN performed "The Eve" from EXO. She was voted as the first place of the group with 184 votes, and the group was ranked third place among all dance groups. On April 5, XIN was voted as the center of the theme song "YES! OK!" with 26 votes from fellow trainees. On April 18, XIN performed "Miss You 3000" (想见你想见你想见你) from the band 831 during the second public performance and won the 1st Place Sweepstake (MVP) with 291 votes. The group was ranked as the first place among all performances. The original singer 831 publicly invited XIN to perform together through Weibo. On May 7, XIN performed "Lion" during the third public performance and won the 1st Place Sweepstake (MVP) with 183 votes. The group was ranked as the first place among all performances. On May 30, XIN performed "YES! OK!", "A Little Bit", and "Promise" with the top 20 trainees on the finale night. XIN finished first in the competition with 17,359,242 votes and debuted as the center of the project girl group THE9. XIN was also awarded the title International Most Popular Trainee at the finale.

On June 1, 2020, XIN released the single "Beatholic", a song she assisted with writing and producing. This is her first individual music production after debuting as the center of THE9. "Beatholic" was prepared in 2019 prior to XIN's audition for Youth with You 2. Japanese music producer Hiroshi Kawaguchi and photographer Mika Ninagawa were invited and assisted with the music and MV production in Japan. On June 5, 2020, "Beatholic" MV was released, featuring Japanese top street dance group KING OF SWAG.On August 10, 2020, THE9 released their first EP "Sphinx X".

On September 11, 2020, XIN attended and performed at the Make Up For Ever new product release event as its brand ambassador. On September 20, XIN attended the Christian Dior fashion event, DESIGNER OF DREAMS, performing "Hot party" and "Don't Want to Miss You" (不要想念你) at its private live concert.

On October 3, 2020, XIN performed <This is X> as a special guest at the season finale of Street Dance of China Season III (这！就是街舞第三季). In the same month, she participated in a podcast documentary, The Nth Years of Intangible Cultural Heritage (非遗第N年), organized by China Central Radio and TV station.  As a storyteller, XIN narrated intangible cultural heritage elements from Guizhou province of China. From September 13 to October 26, XIN competed at the JiangsuTV's Masked Dancing King (蒙面舞王). She was crowned as the Challenger of the second round. On the season's finale, XIN battled in 8v8 routine dance, "Sanchakou" duet dance (a dance incorporating both Peking Opera and popping elements), and an urban dance "Try". XIN won the Best Battle award of the season.

In December 2020, XIN's fashion reality show FOURTRY 2 (潮流合伙人2) was aired. On December 19, she attended the annual Sohu Fashion Award and received the "Most Popular Celebrity" award. On December 25, THE9 released its first album "MatriX" (虚实X境), featuring XIN's original song "Biu Biu". On the same day, XIN was selected "Top Ten People of the Year" by Southern Metropolis Entertainment (南都娱乐). On December 28, XIN was selected as "Most Popular Female Celebrity" by iFeng (凤凰网). On December 31, she delivered her first "BiuBiu" performance on JiangsuTV 2021 New Year's Eve Concert.

On January 5, 2021, XIN was featured on iFeng Entertainment's End of the Year Special Campaign We Still Have Faith - Role Model of the Year (我们还有信仰 – 年度榜样). She was recognized for her tagline "I don't forbid any tags" (我不忌讳任何标签).

On February 9, 2021, XIN performed at the ShandongTV Spring Festival Gala with her solo "Hot Party" and "BiuBiu". On February 10, XIN was a special guest for Liu Qian's magic show on ZhejiangTV Spring Festival Comedy Gala with her teammates. On February 11, XIN performed "Youth on the Run" (奔跑的青春) at CCTV New Year's Gala. On the same day, Kuaishou 2021 Orange vs White Talent Show was aired; XIN performed "Miss You 3000" (想见你想见你想见你) and "BiuBiu". On February 12, XIN collaborated with singer Mao Amin on HunanTV Global Overseas Chinese Spring Festival, performing "BiuBiu" and "Smiling at the Sight of You" (一见你就笑).

On March 26 and 27 2021, THE9 hosted their first online concert X-CITY (虚实之城), an online live-stream concert utilizing extended reality technology (a combination of virtual, augmented and mixed reality).

On April 20, 2021, XIN released her 3-track EP "Epsilon", including songs "Of Course", "Practice", and "U and I". It tops the best selling albums in China and worldwide.
On December 5, 2021, THE9 officially disbanded and XIN began her solo career.

On December 15, 2021, XIN released the MV of "Baby I know", which is the first track of her very first full-length album "Xanadu".

2022 - Present: solo career beginning, Xanadu 
Over the course of December 2021 – September 2022, XIN has released 9 songs of "Xanadu". "Xanadu" includes 10 songs and 10 music videos in total, performed in 10+ distinct dancing styles. XIN experimented traditional Chinese folk music with modern pop in this album. From her interview with Global People (环球人物) and Harpers Bazaar-Vietnam Magazine, this has been a deep interest of her since she grew up in one of the most ethnically diverse region of China. The 9 songs that have been released are "Baby I Know", "Black Sun and White Moon", "Hurricane", "New and More", "X-plan", "Look Into The Mirror", "Like Love", "I and I", and "Boom Tick Boom". The last song has remained a secret track, which will soon be released. XIN collaborated with producers such as Tiger JK, Jeremy Ji, Arai Soichiro to produce the album, where she co-produced and solo-produced a couple of the songs. Her involvement of the album goes beyond as she authored majority of the songs' lyrics. In terms of dance MV, international dancers, including Acky (popping), Melvin Timtim (Hiphop), Tight Eyez (Krump), Aya Sato (Voguing), Lyle Beniga, Lachica, Galen Hooks, 1Million - Jinwoo & Youngbeen, and Kiel Tutin, led the choreography of each songs.

On July 18, 2022, SM released "Better" (Chinese version), where XIN collaborated with BoA, planned and produced by executive producer Lee Sooman. "Better" tops the Chinese music and MV charts, and has accumulated over millions of view on YouTube, Weibo, and Bilibili.

On August 13, 2022, XIN joined Street Dance of China Season 5 as its very first female captain. Her opening performance showcased her popping skill and New jack swing, a new element for her to incorporate. During an overlapping period of time, XIN also joined E-Pop of China as one of the lead artists to feat various electronic music producers, where she showcased a variety of skills beyond vocals in her performances., including Talkbox, B-box, and Djembe.

Public image and reception

Lady Bees era 
In a report published by 163.com, XIN was described as "not only possesses a cool look, she also has incredible talent in singing and dancing." Nicky Wu, XIN's former mentor during the Lady Bees competition, described XIN's performance as "having a unique style when she sings and dances." When commenting on XIN's stage presence, judge Hong Su stated that "XIN stands out during the competition of Lady Bees", evaluating her performances as having  "a good control of pace and entertainment".

After debuting as a member of LadyBees, China News commented that "XIN and the rest of Lady Bees are extremely energetic both in front of the camera and in real life. They have great synergy in their music and dance."

EP XIN era 

After the release of Liu's EP XIN, famous producer Bingchun Lin commented that XIN possesses the basic quality of being an outstanding artist, which included "professional performances, diligent attitude, positive ambition, and a calm lifestyle". According to Lin, XIN "never fears to pursue new things, challenging her limits nonstop". In their interactions, XIN focuses on "enriching her inner self, keeping up her passion for learning, and showing humbleness and politeness".

Youth with You 2/THE9 era 
After XIN became the winner of Youth with You 2, South China Morning Post commended XIN's win as a demonstration of "being yourself and not another cute clone off a production line". The newspaper highlighted XIN's embodiment of non-conforming beauty standards in an interview with Wu Han, a producer of Youth with You 2. XIN was described as an ideal contestant for the show because she "excelled in multiple areas" and she aligned well with the show's goal of "encouraging diversity". In July 2020, XIN Liu's name was referenced as a positive androgynous role model in a viral social experiment video on anti-bullying. In a video entitled "Butch Girl Is Bullied by Classmates", a bystander intervened the mistreatment of a female student by using XIN Liu's popularity and victory as an example of acceptance, urging the bully party to stop their behaviors.

In an editorial article by RAIIChina, XIN was described to have "Challenged Gender Norms in Mandopop". Her popularity was included as one of the "most significant cultural events and voices in 2020 which spotlighted women's issues in China in a positive push for change".

On Xin's birthday, April 20, 2020, she released her comeback EP 《EPSILON》which recorded a massive 24hrs sales of 42 million Chinese yuan and currently boasts of 47 million yuan sales. The EP was highly praised by professionals for its richness in music styles, lyrics, composition and production.

On December 5, 2021, The9 came out with their final EP 《THE NINE》which also marked the dissolution of the group as their  years came to an end.

Philanthropy 
On September 5, 2016, XIN participated in "Music Radio 'I Want To Go To School' 1200 Education Aid in Action" charity event and fundraiser to support left-behind children in need. On September 6, 2016, she attended the "Lu Chen Foundation – Music Loves to Smile, Hand in Hand for Reunion" charity event. On October 29, 2016, XIN performed in a roadshow organized by "Music Radio 'I Want To Go To School' 1200 Education Aid in Action" in Shanghai and sold autographed souvenirs during charity sales.

In September 2017, XIN served as the Charity Ambassador for the "FACE Fashion Association Charity Event" and visited children with autism spectrum disorder in Shanghai Pudong Special Education School.

In September 2018, XIN participated in the "Music Loves to Smile in School" charity event organized by Shanghai Hai Kang Bei Foundation to support children with autism spectrum disorder.

In September 2018, XIN participated in the "Daliang Mountain Charity Event" organized by FACE Charity Foundation and Cedar Charity.

On January 31, 2019, XIN participated in the "Charity Sale Celebrity Referrer" hosted by Xiantou Commonweal, selling personal items and donating all proceeds to designated charity project "Education Aid for Tibet", and contributing to the construction of the Hope Primary School located in Tibet, China.

On May 25, 2020, XIN donated 10,000 CNY to the Aixiaoya Foundation Project of China Social Welfare Foundation, contributing to the promotion of feminine care and reproductive health education for girls in rural areas.

On September 9, 2020, XIN served as the Goodwill Ambassador of Renren Charity and participated in the "Good School" project organized by China Foundation for Poverty Alleviation.

On January 18, 2021, XIN was invited by Southern Weekly and participated in the creation of the Beijing Contemporary Art Foundation (BCAF). The purpose of this foundation was to discover innovative culture and to motivate artistic philanthropic arts. Through "Renewal of Spring" (万象回春) new year stationary boxes, proceeds from this sale contributed to the development of BCAF Emerging Cultural Journalism Scholarships for young talents, further supporting the development of culture and arts.

On 21 July 2021, XIN donated 1,000,000 CNY to the Red Cross Society in Zhengzhou. The donation will be channeled towards the recovery of Henan after having experienced severe flooding.

Discography

Extended plays

Singles

Filmography

Film

Television shows

Ambassadorships and endorsements

Individual

Group

Awards and recognition

Individual

Group

Notes

References

External links 
 
 
 

1997 births
Living people
THE9 members
People from Guiyang
Chinese idols
Chinese pop singers
Chinese women rappers
Chinese rappers
Youth With You contestants
21st-century Chinese women singers
Manchu people